Lisagor or Turshsu is a village that is, de facto, in the Shushi Province of the breakaway Republic of Artsakh; de jure, it is in the Shusha District of Azerbaijan, in the disputed region of Nagorno-Karabakh. The village had an Azerbaijani-majority population before they fled the fighting of the First Nagorno-Karabakh War.

History 
The village was founded in the beginning of the 20th century as the Russian settlement of Lysogor in the Shusha Uyezd of the Elisabethpol Governorate in the Russian Empire. In 1914, 36 people lived in the village, mostly Russians.

During the Soviet period, the village was part of the Shusha District of the Nagorno-Karabakh Autonomous Oblast.

Economy and culture 
The population is mainly engaged in agriculture and animal husbandry. As of 2015, the village has a municipal building, a house of culture, a secondary school, and a medical centre. The Lisagor branch of the Shushi Children's Music School is also located in the village.

Demographics 
The village had 88 inhabitants in 2005, and 130 inhabitants in 2015.

References

External links 

 

Populated places in Shushi Province
Populated places in Shusha District